Peter Reynolds (born 26 August 1937) is a British coxswain. He competed in the men's eight event at the 1960 Summer Olympics.

References

1937 births
Living people
British male rowers
Olympic rowers of Great Britain
Rowers at the 1960 Summer Olympics
Sportspeople from Sheffield
Coxswains (rowing)